Sir Joseph Birch, 1st Baronet (1755–1833), of The Hazles, Prescot, near Liverpool, England, was the Member of Parliament for Nottingham from 1802 to 16 March 1803 and in 1818–1830, and for Ludgershall on 22 December 1812 – 1818. He was created baronet in 1831.

References

1755 births
1833 deaths
Baronets in the Baronetage of the United Kingdom
People from Prescot
UK MPs 1802–1806
UK MPs 1818–1820
UK MPs 1820–1826
UK MPs 1826–1830
Politicians from Merseyside